Hugh David Flack (26 April 1903 – after 1933) was an Irish professional footballer who played as a full back. He won one cap for Ireland.

External links
Hugh Flack biography at Northern Ireland Footballing Greats

1903 births
Association footballers from Belfast
Association footballers from Northern Ireland
Pre-1950 IFA international footballers
Crusaders F.C. players
Burnley F.C. players
Swansea City A.F.C. players
Lisburn Distillery F.C. players
Halifax Town A.F.C. players
English Football League players
Year of death missing
Association football fullbacks